This is a list of artesian wells in the United States.

Artesian, South Dakota wells
Artesian, Washington wells
Artesian Commons, Olympia, Washington
The Artesian Hotel, Sulphur, Oklahoma
Artesian Water Co. Pumphouse and Wells, Boise, Idaho
Artesian Well Park, Salt Lake City, Utah
Harundale, Maryland well
Hornsby, Tennessee wells including one at Hornsby Elementary School
Ludowici Well, Ludowici, Georgia
Maka Yusota, Savage, Minnesota
Olympia Brewery, Olympia, Washington (see Olympia Brewing Company#Use of artesian water)
Polk Theater well, Lakeland, Florida; possibly used in the loop of the first air conditioning system in America
Pryor Avenue Iron Well, Milwaukee, Wisconsin
Southwestern Lunatic Asylum–Hot Wells, San Antonio, Texas
Sulphur Springs, Tampa, Florida
Well Number 5, Lynnwood, Washington
Wiley's Well, Colorado Desert, California

See also
List of hot springs in the United States
List of major springs in Florida

Further reading

Artesian wells
Artesian wells